Amagi Line may refer to:

Amagi Railway Amagi Line
Nishitetsu Amagi Line